The men's light heavyweight (81 kg/178.2 lbs) K-1 category at the W.A.K.O. World Championships 2007 in Belgrade was the fourth heaviest of the K-1 tournaments, involving fifteen fighters from two continents (Europe and Africa).  Each of the matches was three rounds of two minutes each and were fought under K-1 rules.

As there was one too few contestants for a sixteen-man tournament, one of the fighters had a bye through to the quarter finals.  The tournament gold medallist was Ukraine's Dmitry Kirpan who defeated Croatia's Luka Simic.  Dzianis Hanchardnak from the Belarus and Alexander Stetsurenko from Russia received bronze medals for their efforts in reaching the semi finals.

Results

See also
List of WAKO Amateur World Championships
List of WAKO Amateur European Championships
List of male kickboxers

References

External links
 WAKO World Association of Kickboxing Organizations Official Site

Kickboxing events at the WAKO World Championships 2007 Belgrade
2007 in kickboxing
Kickboxing in Serbia